WestGrid is a government-funded infrastructure program started in 2003, mainly in Western Canada, that provides institutional research faculty and students access to high performance computing and distributed data storage, using a combination of grid, networking, and collaboration tools. WestGrid is one of four partners within the umbrella organization, Compute Canada.

Principal participants
WestGrid has 14 partner institutions across four provinces - British Columbia, Alberta, Saskatchewan and Manitoba. The participating institutions include:

 Simon Fraser University
 University of British Columbia
 University of Victoria
 University of Northern British Columbia
 The Banff Centre
 University of Alberta
 University of Calgary
 University of Lethbridge
 Athabasca University
 University of Saskatchewan
 University of Regina
 University of Manitoba
 University of Winnipeg
 Brandon University

WestGrid also works in partnership with each province's Optical Regional Advanced Network. WestGrid's network partners include: 
 BCNET
 Cybera
 SRnet
 MRnet
 CANARIE

References

External links
Official website

Grid computing